The 2012 Piala Indonesia Final was a football match that took place on 14 July 2012 at Sultan Agung Stadium in Bantul. It was the sixth final of Piala Indonesia and contested by Persibo Bojonegoro and Semen Padang FC. Persibo won the match 1–0 courtesy of a goal from Dian Irawan in the 50th minute to give them their first Piala Indonesia title. As winners, they gained entry to the 2013 AFC Cup.

Road to the final

Note: In all results below, the score of the finalist is given first (H: home; A: away).

Match details

See also
2012 Piala Indonesia

References

2012 Final
2011–12 in Indonesian football